The 2000–01 NBA season was the 76ers 52nd season in the National Basketball Association, and 38th season in Philadelphia. All-Star guard Allen Iverson had his best season in 2001; he led the 76ers to win their first ten games, and started for the Eastern Conference at the 2001 NBA All-Star Game in Washington D.C., and won All-Star MVP honors. The Sixers also posted a 56–26 record, which was the best in the Eastern Conference that season, and the team's first 50-win season since 1989–90. It was also the 76ers' best regular season record since 1984–85.

Iverson averaged a then-career high of 31.1 points per game, winning his second NBA scoring title in the process. He also won the NBA steals title at 2.5 per game, and contributed 4.6 assists per game. Iverson was selected to the All-NBA First Team, and named NBA Most Valuable Player for his accomplishments, beating Tim Duncan and Shaquille O'Neal by a wide margin. In addition, head coach Larry Brown was named NBA Coach of the Year, All-Star center Dikembe Mutombo, who was acquired from the Atlanta Hawks in a midseason trade, won his fourth NBA Defensive Player of the Year Award, while being named to the All-NBA Second Team and NBA All-Defensive First Team, and Aaron McKie won the NBA Sixth Man of the Year Award. McKie averaged 11.6 points, 5.0 assists and 1.4 steals per game, while Tyrone Hill provided the team with 9.6 points and 9.0 rebounds per game, Eric Snow contributed 9.8 points, 7.5 assists and 1.5 steals per game, but only played just 50 games due to a stress fracture in his right ankle, and George Lynch provided with 8.4 points and 7.2 rebounds per game. The 76ers had the fifth best team defensive rating in the NBA.

However, this season was not without controversy. With the Sixers having a big lead in the Eastern Conference with a 36–14 record at the All-Star break, Theo Ratliff sustained a wrist injury that sidelined him for the remainder of season after 50 games,
thus only having Matt Geiger and second-year player Todd MacCulloch at center. Ratliff was also selected to play in the All-Star Game along with Iverson, but did not play because of his injury. The Sixers then traded him along with Toni Kukoč, and Nazr Mohammed to Atlanta for Mutombo. By trading Kukoc (who was not included in the original proposed deal, and who won three championships with Phil Jackson as his coach during his tenure with the Chicago Bulls), the Sixers had only one other player on the roster who had NBA Finals experience, Snow, who played a total of 24 minutes in 10 games in the 1996 NBA Playoffs as a reserve for the Seattle SuperSonics. At one point the team's record was 42–14, but finished 14–12 the rest of the way, including a five-game losing streak in March.

In the last game of the season (at home against the Chicago Bulls), Larry Brown rested his starters instead of trying to go for a win. Had the Sixers won this game, they would have had the league's second best record (behind the San Antonio Spurs), and home court advantage over the Los Angeles Lakers in the Finals. Both had the same record, but the Lakers' record for non-conference opponents was better than Philadelphia's.

In the playoffs, Iverson and the Sixers faced the 8th-seeded Indiana Pacers in the Eastern Conference First Round. Despite losing Game 1 at home, 79–78, the Sixers won the next three games, thus the series, before meeting the Vince Carter-led Toronto Raptors in the Eastern Conference Semi-finals. The Raptors took a 2–1 series lead, but the Sixers managed to win the series in seven games. In the Eastern Conference Finals, the Sixers trailed 2–1 to the Milwaukee Bucks, but managed to win the series also in seven games, to advance to the NBA Finals against the defending champion Los Angeles Lakers. Iverson scored 48 points in Game 1, which the Sixers won on the road in overtime, 107–101. However, the Shaquille O'Neal and Kobe Bryant-led Lakers would win the next 4 games and the title. Following the season, Hill was traded along with second-year forward Jumaine Jones back to his former team, the Cleveland Cavaliers, and Lynch was dealt to the Charlotte Hornets.

The team's season roster has been featured in the video game series NBA 2K. However, Rodney Buford, Roshown McLeod, Kevin Ollie, Pepe Sánchez, Raja Bell, and Speedy Claxton have been excluded from past installations of the game due to issues in regards to the permission of using the players' likenesses in the games.

For the season, the 76ers slightly redesigned their uniforms, which remained in use until 2007. This was the last time the 76ers won the Atlantic Division title and clinched the #1 seed in the Eastern Conference playoffs until the 2020–21 COVID-19 pandemic-shortened season.

Offseason
During the off-season, the 76ers were not involved in any trades. In the 2000 NBA draft, they drafted guard Speedy Claxton and swingman Mark Karcher. Claxton missed the entire season due to a knee injury, while Karcher would be waived on October 18. Karcher would not play any games in the NBA.

Their first transaction was made on August 17, when they signed Jermaine Jackson. Jackson almost made the team, but he was waived one day before the team's season opener.

On October 2, the 76ers signed Ademola Okulaja and Pepe Sánchez. Okulaja was on the team's roster, but did not play in any regular season games. He was waived on December 19. Sánchez played 19 games with the Sixers before being traded to the Atlanta Hawks with Toni Kukoč, Nazr Mohammed, and Theo Ratliff for Roshown McLeod and Dikembe Mutombo on February 22. Sánchez played 5 games with Atlanta before being waived on March 12. Three days later, Sánchez would once again sign with the Sixers.

On October 28, the 76ers signed Vernon Maxwell, who previously played for the team during the 1995–96 season. Maxwell would play in 24 games with the Sixers before being waived on December 22.

NBA Draft

Roster

Roster Notes
 Rookie point guard Speedy Claxton missed the entire season due to a knee injury.

Regular season

Season standings

z – clinched division title
y – clinched division title
x – clinched playoff spot

Record vs. opponents

Game log

Regular season

|- align="center" bgcolor="#ccffcc"
| 1
| October 31
| @ New York
| W 101–72
| Allen Iverson (25)
| George Lynch (11)
| Allen Iverson (9)
| Madison Square Garden19,763
| 1–0

|- align="center" bgcolor="#ccffcc"
| 2
| November 1
| Toronto
| W 104–98
| Allen Iverson (24)
| Tyrone Hill (10)
| Eric Snow (8)
| First Union Center19,817
| 2–0
|- align="center" bgcolor="#ccffcc"
| 3
| November 3
| @ Orlando
| W 87–80
| Allen Iverson (29)
| Theo Ratliff (17)
| Eric Snow (7)
| TD Waterhouse Centre14,233
| 3–0
|- align="center" bgcolor="#ccffcc"
| 4
| November 4
| @ Miami
| W 84–82
| Allen Iverson (23)
| Tyrone Hill (8)
| Eric Snow (6)
| American Airlines Arena16,029
| 4–0
|- align="center" bgcolor="#ccffcc"
| 5
| November 8
| Detroit
| W 103–94
| Allen Iverson (28)
| Theo Ratliff (8)
| Allen Iverson (8)
| First Union Center15,986
| 5–0
|- align="center" bgcolor="#ccffcc"
| 6
| November 9
| @ Minnesota
| W 84–82
| Eric Snow (22)
| Theo Ratliff (14)
| Allen Iverson (5)
| Target Center16,119
| 6–0
|- align="center" bgcolor="#ccffcc"
| 7
| November 11
| Boston
| W 85–83
| Eric Snow (25)
| George Lynch (13)
| Allen Iverson (7)
| First Union Center19,258
| 7–0
|- align="center" bgcolor="#ccffcc"
| 8
| November 15
| Cleveland
| W 107–98
| George Lynch (23)
| Ratliff, McKie (5)
| Eric Snow (7)
| First Union Center16,328
| 8–0
|- align="center" bgcolor="#ccffcc"
| 9
| November 17
| Miami
| W 94–73
| Allen Iverson (19)
| Tyrone Hill (9)
| Aaron McKie (6)
| First Union Center20,720
| 9–0
|- align="center" bgcolor="#ccffcc"
| 10
| November 20
| @ Boston
| W 114–90
| Allen Iverson (26)
| Matt Geiger (9)
| Eric Snow (12)
| FleetCenter15,209
| 10–0
|- align="center" bgcolor="#ffcccc"
| 11
| November 22
| @ Charlotte
| L 73–88
| Snow, Geiger, Maxwell (10)
| Matt Geiger (8)
| Eric Snow (5)
| Charlotte Coliseum15,306
| 10–1
|- align="center" bgcolor="#ccffcc"
| 12
| November 24
| @ Atlanta
| W 76–67
| Allen Iverson (21)
| Theo Ratliff (14)
| Eric Snow (4)
| Philips Arena17,601
| 11–1
|- align="center" bgcolor="#ffcccc"
| 13
| November 25
| @ San Antonio
| L 76–96
| Allen Iverson (21)
| Tyrone Hill (9)
| Eric Snow (3)
| Alamodome33,046
| 11–2
|- align="center" bgcolor="#ccffcc"
| 14
| November 29
| Washington
| W 93–87
| Allen Iverson (29)
| Tyrone Hill (10)
| Eric Snow (9)
| First Union Center16,263
| 12–2

|- align="center" bgcolor="#ccffcc"
| 15
| December 1
| Charlotte
| W 95–74
| Allen Iverson (37)
| Allen Iverson (10)
| Eric Snow (9)
| First Union Center18,377
| 13–2
|- align="center" bgcolor="#ccffcc"
| 16
| December 2
| @ Cleveland
| W 112–78
| Allen Iverson (27)
| Allen Iverson (7)
| Eric Snow (11)
| Gund Arena20,562
| 14–2
|- align="center" bgcolor="#ffcccc"
| 17
| December 4
| @ Denver
| L 98–105
| Allen Iverson (37)
| Allen Iverson (9)
| Eric Snow (9)
| Pepsi Center15,129
| 14–3
|- align="center" bgcolor="#ffcccc"
| 18
| December 5
| @ L.A. Lakers
| L 85–96
| Allen Iverson (27)
| Eric Snow (8)
| Eric Snow (6)
| Staples Center18,997
| 14–4
|- align="center" bgcolor="#ccffcc"
| 19
| December 8
| @ Portland
| W 107–94
| Allen Iverson (30)
| Ratliff, McKie (10)
| Allen Iverson (10)
| Rose Garden Arena20,113
| 15–4
|- align="center" bgcolor="#ccffcc"
| 20
| December 9
| @ Vancouver
| W 83–79
| Allen Iverson (18)
| Theo Ratliff (10)
| Aaron McKie (5)
| General Motors Place15,671
| 16–4
|- align="center" bgcolor="#ffcccc"
| 21
| December 11
| Minnesota
| L 91–96 (OT)
| Allen Iverson (26)
| Tyrone Hill (13)
| Allen Iverson (7)
| First Union Center18,707
| 16–5
|- align="center" bgcolor="#ccffcc"
| 22
| December 13
| @ Washington
| W 102–82
| Allen Iverson (25)
| Theo Ratliff (13)
| Aaron McKie (6)
| MCI Center14,923
| 17–5
|- align="center" bgcolor="#ffcccc"
| 23
| December 15
| Dallas
| L 94–112
| Allen Iverson (26)
| Theo Ratliff (9)
| George Lynch (4)
| First Union Center18,563
| 17–6
|- align="center" bgcolor="#ccffcc"
| 24
| December 16
| @ Chicago
| W 99–91
| Allen Iverson (33)
| Todd MacCulloch (13)
| Allen Iverson (8)
| United Center22,110
| 18–6
|- align="center" bgcolor="#ffcccc"
| 25
| December 20
| Utah
| L 89–91
| Allen Iverson (45)
| Tyrone Hill (12)
| Toni Kukoč (4)
| First Union Center19,428
| 18–7
|- align="center" bgcolor="#ffcccc"
| 26
| December 22
| New York
| L 71–91
| Allen Iverson (19)
| Ratliff, McKie, Kukoč (6)
| Allen Iverson (8)
| First Union Center20,670
| 18–8
|- align="center" bgcolor="#ccffcc"
| 27
| December 26
| @ Utah
| W 97–91
| Aaron McKie (24)
| Tyrone Hill (8)
| Kevin Ollie (7)
| First Union Center19,911
| 19–8
|- align="center" bgcolor="#ccffcc"
| 28
| December 27
| @ Golden State
| W 118–110
| Allen Iverson (29)
| Tyrone Hill (15)
| Aaron McKie (7)
| The Arena in Oakland18,726
| 20–8
|- align="center" bgcolor="#ccffcc"
| 29
| December 30
| @ Sacramento
| W 107–104 (OT)
| Allen Iverson (46)
| Tyrone Hill (13)
| Aaron McKie (14)
| ARCO Arena17,317
| 21–8

|- align="center" bgcolor="#ccffcc"
| 30
| January 3
| Atlanta
| W 98–80
| Allen Iverson (21)
| Ratliff, Hill (11)
| Aaron McKie (10)
| First Union Center17,643
| 22–8
|- align="center" bgcolor="#ccffcc"
| 31
| January 5
| Seattle
| W 121–89
| Allen Iverson (41)
| Tyrone Hill (11)
| Aaron McKie (6)
| First Union Center20,240
| 23–8
|- align="center" bgcolor="#ccffcc"
| 32
| January 6
| @ Cleveland
| W 107–103
| Allen Iverson (54)
| Theo Ratliff (9)
| Aaron McKie (9)
| Gund Arena20,562
| 24–8
|- align="center" bgcolor="#ccffcc"
| 33
| January 9
| @ New Jersey
| W 104–87
| Allen Iverson (22)
| Theo Ratliff (13)
| Aaron McKie (7)
| Continental Airlines Arena13,340
| 25–8
|- align="center" bgcolor="#ffcccc"
| 34
| January 10
| Portland
| L 75–93
| Aaron McKie (15)
| Hill, Lynch (8)
| Aaron McKie (5)
| First Union Center20,645
| 25–9
|- align="center" bgcolor="#ccffcc"
| 35
| January 12
| @ Washington
| W 86–82
| Allen Iverson (29)
| Tyrone Hill (20)
| Aaron McKie (7)
| MCI Center20,674
| 26–9
|- align="center" bgcolor="#ccffcc"
| 36
| January 13
| San Antonio
| W 100–83
| Allen Iverson (40)
| George Lynch (9)
| Aaron McKie (10)
| First Union Center20,607
| 27–9
|- align="center" bgcolor="#ccffcc"
| 37
| January 15
| Charlotte
| W 84–79
| Allen Iverson (35)
| George Lynch (16)
| Allen Iverson (7)
| First Union Center20,188
| 28–9
|- align="center" bgcolor="#ccffcc"
| 38
| January 17
| Chicago
| W 99–88
| Allen Iverson (43)
| George Lynch (9)
| Aaron McKie (7)
| First Union Center18,674
| 29–9
|- align="center" bgcolor="#ccffcc"
| 39
| January 19
| New Jersey
| W 97–86
| Aaron McKie (21)
| Tyrone Hill (10)
| Kevin Ollie (9)
| First Union Center20,249
| 30–9
|- align="center" bgcolor="#ffcccc"
| 40
| January 21
| Toronto
| L 106–110 (OT)
| Allen Iverson (51)
| Theo Ratliff (13)
| Aaron McKie (7)
| First Union Center20,583
| 30–10
|- align="center" bgcolor="#ccffcc"
| 41
| January 23
| @ Dallas
| W 114–98
| Allen Iverson (30)
| George Lynch (13)
| Aaron McKie (11)
| Reunion Arena18,187
| 31–10
|- align="center" bgcolor="#ccffcc"
| 42
| January 24
| @ Houston
| W 85–84 (OT)
| Allen Iverson (32)
| Tyrone Hill (19)
| Iverson, McKie, Ollie (3)
| Compaq Center14,051
| 32–10
|- align="center" bgcolor="#ccffcc"
| 43
| January 26
| Detroit
| W 105–89
| Allen Iverson (44)
| Hill, Lynch (13)
| Aaron McKie (5)
| First Union Center18,609
| 33–10
|- align="center" bgcolor="#ccffcc"
| 44
| January 28
| @ Indiana
| W 86–81
| Allen Iverson (27)
| George Lynch (12)
| Allen Iverson (8)
| Conseco Fieldhouse18,345
| 34–10
|- align="center" bgcolor="#ffcccc"
| 45
| January 30
| @ Toronto
| L 89–96
| Allen Iverson (38)
| Tyrone Hill (14)
| Aaron McKie (10)
| Air Canada Centre19,800
| 34–11

|- align="center" bgcolor="#ccffcc"
| 46
| February 1
| @ New York
| W 87–80
| Allen Iverson (31)
| Theo Ratliff (13)
| Iverson, McKie (8)
| Madison Square Garden19,763
| 35–11
|- align="center" bgcolor="#ffcccc"
| 47
| February 2
| Orlando
| L 117–123 (2OT)
| Allen Iverson (47)
| Theo Ratliff (13)
| Allen Iverson (7)
| First Union Center20,645
| 35–12
|- align="center" bgcolor="#ffcccc"
| 48
| February 4
| @ New Jersey
| L 89–96
| Allen Iverson (32)
| Theo Ratliff (12)
| Aaron McKie (9)
| Continental Airlines Arena17,764
| 35–13
|- align="center" bgcolor="#ccffcc"
| 49
| February 5
| Denver
| W 99–80
| Allen Iverson (37)
| Jumaine Jones (9)
| Aaron McKie (10)
| First Union Center18,726
| 36–13
|- align="center" bgcolor="#ffcccc"
| 50
| February 7
| Houston
| L 87–112
| Allen Iverson (26)
| George Lynch (11)
| Aaron McKie (8)
| First Union Center17,661
| 36–14
|- align="center" bgcolor="#ccffcc"
| 51
| February 13
| @ Milwaukee
| W 107–104
| Allen Iverson (49)
| Tyrone Hill (16)
| Snow, McKie (6)
| Bradley Center18,717
| 37–14
|- align="center" bgcolor="#ccffcc"
| 52
| February 14
| L.A. Lakers
| W 112–97
| Allen Iverson (40)
| Hill, MacCulloch (7)
| Allen Iverson (9)
| First Union Center21,005
| 38–14
|- align="center" bgcolor="#ccffcc"
| 53
| February 16
| L.A. Clippers
| W 108–93
| Allen Iverson (42)
| Tyrone Hill (13)
| Eric Snow (8)
| First Union Center20,592
| 39–14
|- align="center" bgcolor="#ccffcc"
| 54
| February 18
| Phoenix
| W 104–98
| Allen Iverson (26)
| George Lynch (12)
| Eric Snow (8)
| First Union Center20,781
| 40–14
|- align="center" bgcolor="#ccffcc"
| 55
| February 21
| Vancouver
| W 107–91
| Allen Iverson (36)
| Tyrone Hill (12)
| Eric Snow (7)
| First Union Center17,944
| 41–14
|- align="center" bgcolor="#ccffcc"
| 56
| February 23
| @ Detroit
| W 99–78
| Allen Iverson (43)
| Dikembe Mutombo (13)
| Eric Snow (6)
| The Palace of Auburn Hills22,076
| 42–14
|- align="center" bgcolor="#ffcccc"
| 57
| February 24
| @ Charlotte
| L 85–86
| Allen Iverson (47)
| Tyrone Hill (13)
| Eric Snow (8)
| Charlotte Coliseum19,925
| 42–15
|- align="center" bgcolor="#ffcccc"
| 58
| February 26
| Milwaukee
| L 91–98
| Allen Iverson (26)
| Dikembe Mutombo (16)
| Eric Snow (9)
| First Union Center20,324
| 42–16
|- align="center" bgcolor="#ccffcc"
| 59
| February 28
| Miami
| W 79–69
| Allen Iverson (27)
| Dikembe Mutombo (18)
| Iverson, Snow, McKie (3)
| First Union Center20,562
| 43–16

|- align="center" bgcolor="#ccffcc"
| 60
| March 2
| Washington
| W 107–102
| Allen Iverson (41)
| Dikembe Mutombo (16)
| Eric Snow (11)
| First Union Center20,257
| 44–16
|- align="center" bgcolor="#ccffcc"
| 61
| March 7
| New Jersey
| W 102–94
| Allen Iverson (38)
| Tyrone Hill (14)
| Eric Snow (8)
| First Union Center19,930
| 45–16
|- align="center" bgcolor="#ccffcc"
| 62
| March 9
| Atlanta
| W 108–103
| Allen Iverson (47)
| Dikembe Mutombo (13)
| Eric Snow (13)
| First Union Center20,672
| 46–16
|- align="center" bgcolor="#ccffcc"
| 63
| March 11
| @ Boston
| W 97–91
| Eric Snow (19)
| Dikembe Mutombo (22)
| Eric Snow (10)
| FleetCenter18,624
| 47–16
|- align="center" bgcolor="#ccffcc"
| 64
| March 14
| @ Chicago
| W 85–67
| Tyrone Hill (16)
| Dikembe Mutombo (12)
| Eric Snow (7)
| United Center22,835
| 48–16
|- align="center" bgcolor="#ffcccc"
| 65
| March 16
| Sacramento
| L 79–100
| Allen Iverson (28)
| George Lynch (8)
| Eric Snow (7)
| First Union Center20,866
| 48–17
|- align="center" bgcolor="#ffcccc"
| 66
| March 17
| @ Milwaukee
| L 78–87
| Aaron McKie (23)
| Hill, Mutombo (10)
| Aaron McKie (10)
| Bradley Center18,717
| 48–18
|- align="center" bgcolor="#ffcccc"
| 67
| March 19
| @ Seattle
| L 89–93
| Aaron McKie (21)
| George Lynch (13)
| Eric Snow (9)
| KeyArena17,072
| 48–19
|- align="center" bgcolor="#ffcccc"
| 68
| March 20
| @ L.A. Clippers
| L 77–88
| Aaron McKie (22)
| Aaron McKie (7)
| Eric Snow (9)
| Staples Center19,680
| 48–20
|- align="center" bgcolor="#ffcccc"
| 69
| March 23
| @ Phoenix
| L 71–84
| Aaron McKie (20)
| Dikembe Mutombo (13)
| Aaron McKie (4)
| America West Arena19,023
| 48–21
|- align="center" bgcolor="#ccffcc"
| 70
| March 26
| Milwaukee
| W 90–78
| Allen Iverson (36)
| Dikembe Mutombo (17)
| Eric Snow (13)
| First Union Center20,561
| 49–21
|- align="center" bgcolor="#ffcccc"
| 71
| March 28
| Orlando
| L 95–96
| Allen Iverson (37)
| Tyrone Hill (17)
| Eric Snow (10)
| First Union Center20,683
| 49–22
|- align="center" bgcolor="#ccffcc"
| 72
| March 30
| Golden State
| W 102–89
| Allen Iverson (35)
| Tyrone Hill (14)
| Allen Iverson (9)
| First Union Center20,958
| 50–22

|- align="center" bgcolor="#ccffcc"
| 73
| April 1
| Indiana
| W 104–93
| Allen Iverson (37)
| Tyrone Hill (13)
| Eric Snow (9)
| First Union Center20,690
| 50–23
|- align="center" bgcolor="#ffcccc"
| 74
| April 3
| @ Toronto
| L 85–100
| Allen Iverson (18)
| Dikembe Mutombo (16)
| Eric Snow (8)
| Air Canada Centre19,800
| 51–23
|- align="center" bgcolor="#ccffcc"
| 75
| April 4
| @ Detroit
| W 90–84
| Dikembe Mutombo (21)
| Dikembe Mutombo (16)
| Eric Snow (7)
| The Palace of Auburn Hills16,485
| 52–23
|- align="center" bgcolor="#ccffcc"
| 76
| April 6
| Cleveland
| W 96–88
| Dikembe Mutombo (27)
| Dikembe Mutombo (13)
| Kevin Ollie (10)
| First Union Center20,767
| 53–23
|- align="center" bgcolor="#ccffcc"
| 77
| April 9
| Boston
| W 108–95
| Allen Iverson (37)
| Dikembe Mutombo (19)
| Eric Snow (9)
| First Union Center20,365
| 54–23
|- align="center" bgcolor="#ffcccc"
| 78
| April 10
| @ Miami
| L 81–83
| Allen Iverson (41)
| Dikembe Mutombo (12)
| Eric Snow (7)
| American Airlines Arena20,098
| 54–24
|- align="center" bgcolor="#ffcccc"
| 79
| April 12
| @ Orlando
| L 77–101
| Tyrone Hill (16)
| Matt Geiger (7)
| Eric Snow (9)
| TD Waterhouse Centre17,248
| 54–25
|- align="center" bgcolor="#ccffcc"
| 80
| April 15
| New York
| W 89–82
| Allen Iverson (27)
| Dikembe Mutombo (16)
| Aaron McKie (9)
| First Union Center20,699
| 55–25
|- align="center" bgcolor="#ccffcc"
| 81
| April 17
| @ Indiana
| W 111–105 (OT)
| Jumaine Jones (26)
| Jumaine Jones (13)
| Eric Snow (8)
| Conseco Fieldhouse18,345
| 56–25
|- align="center" bgcolor="#ffcccc"
| 82
| April 18
| Chicago
| L 86–92
| Todd MacCulloch (21)
| Geiger, Lynch (9)
| Eric Snow (9)
| First Union Center19,449
| 56–26

Playoffs

|- align="center" bgcolor="#ffcccc"
| 1
| April 21
| Indiana
| L 78–79
| Aaron McKie (18)
| Dikembe Mutombo (22)
| Iverson, McKie (7)
| First Union Center20,613
| 0–1
|- align="center" bgcolor="#ccffcc"
| 2
| April 24
| Indiana
| W 116–98
| Allen Iverson (45)
| Dikembe Mutombo (11)
| Allen Iverson (9)
| First Union Center20,739
| 1–1
|- align="center" bgcolor="#ccffcc"
| 3
| April 28
| @ Indiana
| W 92–87
| Allen Iverson (32)
| Dikembe Mutombo (15)
| Allen Iverson (6)
| Conseco Fieldhouse18,345
| 2–1
|- align="center" bgcolor="#ccffcc"
| 4
| May 2
| @ Indiana
| W 88–85
| Allen Iverson (33)
| Dikembe Mutombo (11)
| Aaron McKie (6)
| Conseco Fieldhouse18,345
| 3–1
|-

|- align="center" bgcolor="#ffcccc"
| 1
| May 6
| Toronto
| L 93–96
| Allen Iverson (36)
| Dikembe Mutombo (12)
| Eric Snow (7)
| First Union Center20,892
| 0–1
|- align="center" bgcolor="#ccffcc"
| 2
| May 9
| Toronto
| W 97–92
| Allen Iverson (54)
| Tyrone Hill (10)
| Eric Snow (5)
| First Union Center20,870
| 1–1
|- align="center" bgcolor="#ffcccc"
| 3
| May 11
| @ Toronto
| L 78–102
| Allen Iverson (23)
| Dikembe Mutombo (9)
| Allen Iverson (8)
| Air Canada Centre20,436
| 1–2
|- align="center" bgcolor="#ccffcc"
| 4
| May 13
| @ Toronto
| W 84–79
| Allen Iverson (30)
| Dikembe Mutombo (17)
| Iverson, McKie (5)
| Air Canada Centre20,351
| 2–2
|- align="center" bgcolor="#ccffcc"
| 5
| May 16
| Toronto
| W 121–88
| Allen Iverson (52)
| Dikembe Mutombo (9)
| Aaron McKie (9)
| First Union Center20,939
| 3–2
|- align="center" bgcolor="#ffcccc"
| 6
| May 18
| @ Toronto
| L 89–101
| Allen Iverson (20)
| Dikembe Mutombo (14)
| Aaron McKie (6)
| Air Canada Centre20,499
| 3–3
|- align="center" bgcolor="#ccffcc"
| 7
| May 20
| Toronto
| W 88–87
| Aaron McKie (22)
| Dikembe Mutombo (17)
| Allen Iverson (16)
| First Union Center20,848
| 4–3
|-

|- align="center" bgcolor="#ccffcc"
| 1
| May 22
| Milwaukee
| W 93–85
| Allen Iverson (34)
| Dikembe Mutombo (18)
| Iverson, Snow (6)
| First Union Center20,877
| 1–0
|- align="center" bgcolor="#ffcccc"
| 2
| May 24
| Milwaukee
| L 78–92
| Aaron McKie (21)
| Dikembe Mutombo (20)
| Allen Iverson (9)
| First Union Center20,998
| 1–1
|- align="center" bgcolor="#ffcccc"
| 3
| May 26
| @ Milwaukee
| L 74–80
| Aaron McKie (22)
| Dikembe Mutombo (10)
| Aaron McKie (5)
| Bradley Center18,717
| 1–2
|- align="center" bgcolor="#ccffcc"
| 4
| May 28
| @ Milwaukee
| W 89–83
| Allen Iverson (28)
| Dikembe Mutombo (15)
| Aaron McKie (9)
| Bradley Center18,717
| 2–2
|- align="center" bgcolor="#ccffcc"
| 5
| May 30
| Milwaukee
| W 89–88
| Dikembe Mutombo (21)
| Dikembe Mutombo (13)
| Allen Iverson (8)
| First Union Center21,087
| 3–2
|- align="center" bgcolor="#ffcccc"
| 6
| June 1
| @ Milwaukee
| L 100–110
| Allen Iverson (46)
| Dikembe Mutombo (14)
| Aaron McKie (9)
| Bradley Center18,717
| 3–3
|- align="center" bgcolor="#ccffcc"
| 7
| June 3
| Milwaukee
| W 108–91
| Allen Iverson (44)
| Dikembe Mutombo (19)
| Aaron McKie (13)
| First Union Center21,046
| 4–3
|-

|- align="center" bgcolor="#ccffcc"
| 1
| June 6
| @ L.A. Lakers
| W 107–101 (OT)
| Allen Iverson (48)
| Dikembe Mutombo (16)
| Aaron McKie (9)
| Staples Center18,997
| 1–0
|- align="center" bgcolor="#ffcccc"
| 2
| June 8
| @ L.A. Lakers
| L 89–98
| Allen Iverson (23)
| Dikembe Mutombo (13)
| Aaron McKie (6)
| Staples Center18,997
| 1–1
|- align="center" bgcolor="#ffcccc"
| 3
| June 10
| L.A. Lakers
| L 91–96
| Allen Iverson (35)
| Iverson, Mutombo (12)
| Aaron McKie (8)
| First Union Center20,900
| 1–2
|- align="center" bgcolor="#ffcccc"
| 4
| June 13
| L.A. Lakers
| L 86–100
| Allen Iverson (35)
| Dikembe Mutombo (9)
| Iverson, Snow (4)
| First Union Center20,896
| 1–3
|- align="center" bgcolor="#ffcccc"
| 5
| June 15
| L.A. Lakers
| L 96–108
| Allen Iverson (37)
| Tyrone Hill (13)
| Eric Snow (12)
| First Union Center20,890
| 1–4
|-

NBA Finals
 Game 1 – June 6, Wednesday, 9:00pm et  @Los Angeles, Philadelphia 107, Los Angeles 101 (OT): Philadelphia leads series 1-0
 Game 2 – June 8, Friday, 9:00pm et  @Los Angeles, Los Angeles 98, Philadelphia 89: Series tied 1-1
 Game 3 – June 10, Sunday, 8:30pm et @Philadelphia, Los Angeles 96, Philadelphia 91: Los Angeles leads series 2-1
 Game 4 – June 13, Wednesday, 8:30pm et @Philadelphia,  Los Angeles 100, Philadelphia 86: Los Angeles leads series 3-1
 Game 5 – June 15, Friday, 8:30pm et @Philadelphia,  Los Angeles 108, Philadelphia 96: Los Angeles wins series 4-1

The Finals were played using a 2-3-2 site format, where the first two and last two games are held at the team with home court advantage. The NBA, after experimenting in the early years, restored this original format for the Finals in 1985. As of the 2013–2014 NBA finals played by the San Antonio Spurs and the Miami Heat, the finals have again been returned to a 2-2-1-1-1 format.

Player statistics

NOTE: Please write the players statistics in alphabetical order by last name.

Season

Playoffs

Awards and records
 Allen Iverson, NBA Most Valuable Player Award
 Dikembe Mutombo, NBA Defensive Player of the Year Award
 Aaron McKie, NBA Sixth Man of the Year Award
 Larry Brown, NBA Coach of the Year Award
 Allen Iverson, All-NBA First Team
 Dikembe Mutombo, All-NBA Second Team
 Dikembe Mutombo, NBA All-Defensive First Team

Transactions

References

 Philadelphia 76ers on Basketball Reference

Philadelphia
Philadelphia 76ers seasons
Eastern Conference (NBA) championship seasons
Philadelphia
Philadelphia